Beslan Badrovich Khagba (born 23 May 1956) is a former Minister for Internal Affairs of Abkhazia. He was born 23 May 1956 in Gudauta

In May 2015, following two confrontations between police officers and members of the State Security Service, Interior Minister Raul Lolua handed in his resignation. It was accepted by President Khajimba on the evening of 14 May, and he appointed Khagba as his successor. Earlier, Khagba had been Gagra District Prosecutor.

On 9 October, Khagba was dismissed by Khajimba and replaced by Leonid Dzapshba, who had already been Interior Minister from 2010 to 2011.

References

1956 births
Living people
Ministers for Internal Affairs of Abkhazia
People from Gudauta